Apple Creek is an unincorporated community located in the towns of Freedom and Grand Chute in Outagamie County, Wisconsin, United States. It is in the Appleton, Wisconsin Metropolitan Statistical Area and the Appleton-Oshkosh-Neenah, Wisconsin Combined Statistical Area.

Geography
Apple Creek is located at  (44.325833, -88.375). Its elevation is at 804 feet (245m).

Transportation

References

Unincorporated communities in Wisconsin
Unincorporated communities in Outagamie County, Wisconsin
Appleton–Fox Cities metropolitan area